Roaming refers to the act of wandering or travelling freely and with no specific destination.

Roaming or Roamin' may also refer to:
 Roaming, a telecommunication term
 Roaming user profile, a concept in the Windows NT family of operating systems
 Roaming (film), a 2013 Canadian film written and directed by Michael Ray Fox
 "Roaming",  a song by Rod Wave from the album Pray 4 Love
 "Roamin'", a song by Fat Mattress from the album Fat Mattress II

See also 
 Roam (disambiguation)
 Roamer (disambiguation)
 Rome (disambiguation)